Jeff Moore (March 22, 1780 – September 22, 1835) was an American pioneer and founder of the town of Russell, Ky. While his pioneering was relatively late in the settlement of the Ohio River Valley area, his life exploits have made him a particularly memorable character in the history of the region.

Youth and early life
Aside from his birthdate of March 22, 1780, little else is known about his birth and early life. It is postulated that grew up somewhere in the central Pennsylvania farm lands. Known to have been a lifelong illiterate, Moore claimed to have heard "wild tales" about the lands to the west. He bought a Kentucky Long Rifle and left for what he called his "adventures" sometime in the late 1790s.

Founding of Russell
After fighting for over a decade in the still ongoing Indian Wars, he claimed to have killed "at least Three Hundred Red-Skins." He later retorted that he "counted women as a half, kids only a third and hell-babies was just sport." Finding the Northern Kentucky area to his liking, he wandered through various towns and over a period of five years was run out of nearly fifteen communities over incidents attributed to his hard drinking and extreme, even for the time, racism.

In early 1823, while traveling through the area that is now Russell, Moore decided, upon seeing the area's unique hilly features, that a town built here could be easily fortified and defended against what was his near constant and lifelong fear: "Injun Attack."
Over the next few months, Moore built a large cabin on the highest hill in the area and declared this to be the center of his new town which he subsequently christened Russell. This name was to honor a man he once mistakenly killed in a dispute over "Shine". After these preparations, Moore returned East and gathered what family he could find to return with him and convinced all others possible to join through what was referred to later as a series of "lies, subterfuge and just plain untruths" about his new community.

Moore eventually returned to his new community in late Spring of 1824 with a group of nearly seventy settlers who, with their hard work, built Russell into the thriving community it is today. Moore remained in Russell for the rest of his life where he became a valued member and leader of the town he founded.

Death
Moore died September 22, 1835 after spending five days drifting between a delirious and near comatose state resulting from a severe head injury he received September 17. The most widely accepted explanation of his receiving this injury comes from The Annals of Northern Kentucky 1800–1850: A Concise Yet Incomplete History:

Concerning the events that lead to the death of Russell town founder Jeff Moore, local resident Biddy Harper reported the following that on or around the midnight hour of September 17th she was awakened by what she described as "a ruckus a-coming from around the back of the house." Upon going to investigate, she reported seeing the following scene: "I first saw two men I didn't recognize yelling and carrying on with each other who I surmised from the slur of their speech and seeming little control of their movement were heavily intoxicated. I tried to yell some sense into the two but they were too heavily into the drink to notice me. I gathered from what little speech I could make out the two were fighting over a woman they both wanted to marry. Eventually one man knocked the other to the ground, then he pulled a knife and slashed the man rather deep on the arm yelling 'She's mine and don't you forget' then turned to leave seeming satisfied with himself. The other man with his still good arm grabbed a loose fence post and ran up on the other beating him rather severely about the head and then running off into the night."

The Annals go on to report that Ms. Harper immediately summoned the town doctor who discovering the victim's identity did all he could to "remedy" the town founder. Eventually, the other man was found and identified from his injured arm. He was revealed to be one Thomas Lorry, a cousin of Moore, and the identity of the woman in dispute was reported to be fourteen-year-old Virginia Godfrey, a cousin to both.

Notes

References
Gooding, Johnathan. The Annals of Northern Kentucky 1800–1850: A Concise Yet Incomplete History. Originally published 1875
http://history.ky.gov/sub.php?pageid=113&sectionid=3#NA
http://kentuckyhighlands.net/index.php?option=com_content&task=view&id=17&Itemid=1

American pioneers
1780 births
1835 deaths